21st Reconnaissance Squadron may refer to:

 The 911th Air Refueling Squadron, designated the 21st Reconnaissance Squadron (Long Range) from December 1939 to November 1940 and the 21st Reconnaissance Squadron (Heavy) from November 1940 to April 1942. 
 The 21st Expeditionary Reconnaissance Squadron, designated the 21st Reconnaissance Squadron (Bomber) from April 1943 to August 1943. 
 The 921st Air Refueling Squadron, designated the 21st Reconnaissance Squadron, Photographic from October 1947 to June 1949.

See also
 The 21st Photographic Reconnaissance Squadron
 The 21st Tactical Reconnaissance Squadron, active from August 1943 to May 1944.